Abacetus straneoi is a species of ground beetle in the subfamily Pterostichinae. It was described by Basilewsky in 1946.

References

straneoi
Beetles described in 1946